Derek Jones (24 April 1929 – 26 October 2006) was an English footballer who played as right back for Tranmere Rovers.

References

1929 births
2006 deaths
People from Ellesmere Port
Association football fullbacks
English footballers
Ellesmere Port Town F.C. players
Tranmere Rovers F.C. players
Runcorn F.C. Halton players
English Football League players